Miss Russia 2015 was the 23rd Miss Russia pageant. It took place on April 18, 2015, at the Bravikha Luxury Village Concert Hall, in a contest where fifty contestants from different oblasts competed for the crown. The winner Sofia Nikitchuk, from Yekaterinburg was crowned winner.

Contestants

Judges 
 Oxana Fedorova – Miss Russia 2001 and Miss Universe 2002
 Tatiana Kotova - Miss Russia 2006
 Ksenia Sukhinova – Miss Russia 2007 and Miss World 2008
 Igor Chapurin – Fashion designer
 Regina von Flemming - CEO of a publishing house
 Alexander Oleshko - Actor

References

External links

Miss Russia
2015 beauty pageants
2015 in Russia